David Bishop (born 13 January 1990) is a New Zealand gymnast. He competed in the Men's floor event at the 2014 Commonwealth Games where he won the bronze medal.

David trained at Tri Star gymnastics club in Auckland, coached by David Phillips (a former Commonwealth Games medallist for New Zealand)

References 

1990 births
Living people
New Zealand male artistic gymnasts
Commonwealth Games bronze medallists for New Zealand
Gymnasts at the 2014 Commonwealth Games
Sportspeople from Auckland
Commonwealth Games medallists in gymnastics
Gymnasts at the 2018 Commonwealth Games
21st-century New Zealand people
Medallists at the 2014 Commonwealth Games